The designations W Carinae and w Carinae are distinct and refer to two different stars:
W Carinae, a classical Cepheid variable in the constellation Vela that is now called V Velorum
w Carinae (V520 Carinae), a red giant in the constellation of Carina

Carina (constellation)
Carinae, w